Antonio Pennacchi (26 January 1950 – 3 August 2021) was an Italian writer, winner of the Strega Prize in 2010 for his novel, Canale Mussolini.

Biography
Born in Latina in a family of workers from Umbria (on the paternal side) and of settlers from Veneto (on the maternal side), who arrived in Lazio for the reclamation of the Agro Pontino, Pennacchi was part of a large family with seven children, including the journalist Gianni Pennacchi and the economist and politician Laura Pennacchi. He devoted himself to politics from an early age, but, unlike his brothers, who all adhere to left-wing organizations, he enrolled in the Italian Social Movement, a neo-fascist nationalist and national-conservative party. However, while increasing his political culture, he rejected the neo-fascist ideology and came into conflict with the party leaders and was expelled. After a long reflection, he approached Marxism and converted to Communism, joining the Italian (Marxist–Leninist) Communist Party and participated in the Protests of 1968.

In the meantime he began working as a worker at the Alcatel Cavi in Latina (at the time called "Fulgorcavi"), where he remained for over thirty years. At the end of the seventies, he entered in the Italian Socialist Party and in the CGIL, from which he was expelled. He then joined the UIL and moved to the Italian Communist Party and back to the CGIL, from which he was expelled again in 1983. He then left politics and graduated in literature at the Sapienza University of Rome, starting his activity as a writer.

His debut novel, Mammut, received 55 rejections from 33 publishers, before being published by Donzelli in 1994, winning the Premio del Giovedì Marisa Rusconi. In 1995 he wrote Palude, winner of the Premio nazionale letterario Pisa, dedicated to the city of Latina. He then wrote A red cloud in 1998, a story inspired by the murder of a young couple in Cori, which took place the year before and had great prominence in the national news.

In 2001 he left the publisher  Donzelli and moved to the Arnoldo Mondadori Editore. In 2003, the autobiographical Il fasciocomunista was released, winning the Premio Napoli. The film was adapted in to a movie, titled as My Brother Is an Only Child directed by Daniele Luchetti. The film was a success at the box office and won a special award at the Cannes Film Festival, but Pennacchi has strongly argued with the director as in the second part of the film the plot of the book was changed. Also in 2001, the essays Viaggio per le città del Duce were released. In 2005, the essays of L'autobus di Stalin were released.

In June 2006, the collection of short stories Shaw 150. Stories of factory and its surroundings was released. Pennacchi collaborated, and started a collaboration with Limes. His writings have also appeared in Nuovi Argomenti, MicroMega and Nouvelle Revue Française. Starting from 2007, the author was engaged in a project, together with the Anonymity Writers, which involved the writing of the novel Cronache da un pianeta abbandonato, through the participation and collaboration of unknown authors. Also in 2007 he joined the Democratic Party. In 2008 the essay Fascio e martello was released, in which he described the founding cities of fascism throughout Italy and wrote the subject of the short film Occhi verdi for director Clemente Pernarella.

On 2 March 2010, Canale Mussolini, a novel on the reclamation of the Agro Pontino, was released. The book, defined by the author as "the work for which I came into the world", won the 64th edition of the Strega Prize on 2 July of the same year, the Acqui Award of History as "historical novel of the year", the Book of the Year award, and was a finalist at the Premio Campiello. The novel was acclaimed by a large part of critics and climbed to the top of the sales charts. On November 14 of the same year, he received the Asti d'Appello award in Asti.

On August 3, 2021, Pennacchi died of a heart attack at his home in Latina. Just moments before his death, he was talking at the phone with his wife, when he suddenly collapsed. His wife alerted an ambulance for medical aid. After arriving at home, the ambulance rescuers found Pennacchi dead. He was aged 71.

Works
Mammut, Roma, Donzelli, 1994. .
Il fasciocomunista. Vita scriteriata di Accio Benassi., Milano, Mondadori, 2003. .
L'autobus di Stalin e altri scritti, Firenze, Vallecchi, 2005. .
Shaw 150. Storie di fabbrica e dintorni, Milano, Oscar Mondadori, 2006. .
Fascio e martello. Viaggio per le città del duce, Roma-Bari, Laterza, 2008. .
Canale Mussolini, Milano, Mondadori, 2010. .

References

External links

Official website

1950 births
2021 deaths
20th-century Italian novelists
20th-century Italian male writers
21st-century Italian novelists
Strega Prize winners
21st-century Italian male writers
People of Umbrian descent
People of Venetian descent